David Allen Zdrilic (born 13 April 1974) is an Australian soccer coach and former player, who is currently the assistant coach of Serie B club Genoa. Zdrilic is also a football presenter on the Special Broadcasting Service (SBS), Most recently he was a key figure in SBS's coverage of the 2018 FIFA World Cup in Russia.

Zdrilic played on 30 occasions for the Australia national soccer team, having once scored eight goals in a single match – the second highest recorded for any Australian player, behind Socceroos teammate Archie Thompson, who scored 13 goals in the same game. He was also a member of the Australia national beach soccer team, the Beach Socceroos, having captained the side. He previously played for Sydney FC in the A-League after forging a professional career in Switzerland, Germany, England and Scotland.

As a football presenter on the Special Broadcasting Service (SBS), Zdrilic hosted the 2014 FIFA World Cup in Brazil which won a Logie Award for Most Outstanding Sport Coverage as well as SBS's Friday Night A-League coverage. He has hosted games from the UEFA Champions League, Europa League, various international cup competitions and the football entertainment show Thursday FC on SBS2.

Over the last few years, Zdrilic served in a variety of coaching roles in Germany, Belgium and Italy and the MLS. In early 2022 he became assistant at Serie A club Genoa - the first Australian to coach in Serie A - after turning down the offer of coaching Australia at the 2024 Olympic Games.

Playing career

Early years
Zdrilic attended Patrician Brothers' College, Fairfield and St Patrick's College, Sutherland  during his time as a teenage schoolboy he  featured prominently in all teams including the A Grade squad. He had the opportunity as a child to pursue a tennis career, receiving coaching and playing in tournaments, but chose football instead. After playing through the youth ranks for St George Saints he broke into the senior side in 1993 at the age of 19. Mid-way through the NSW Super League year he signed to Sydney United for the coming National Soccer League season. He made an immediate impact shortly after joining the club, scoring four goals in four games in a preseason cup competition. However, he played most of his first NSL season playing as fullback, netting only once for the year. Zdrilic's versatility meant he was often used in different positions and during the 1994/95 and 1995/96 seasons, he was more often among the goal scorers. It was in the 1996/97 season that for the first time Zdrilic was used as an out and out striker and eventually took out the Golden Boot scoring 21 goals in 26 games. During this time he combined studied a law degree at Sydney University, working full-time at a Western Sydney Law Firm with his footballing duties. It was not until this 1996/97 NSL season that his footballing career rose to the next level.

Zdrilic's first call-up to the national team came in January 1997. After the appointment of Terry Venables as the new Socceroos coach, Australia hosted the Optus Cup a four-team tournament including an Australian squad of domestic-based players. In forming the squad, Venables had asked "who's the leading scorer in the NSL?", the answer being Zdrilic (having scored 12 goals in as many games), and he played all three matches. He continued his scoring ways in the NSL to win the Golden Boot for that season with 21 goals, United topping the table before losing the grand final to Brisbane.

In Europe
His position atop the Australian league attracted attention in Europe, particularly in Switzerland with an offer to join Grasshoppers accepted, where he would initially be loaned out to FC Aarau. After a season at Aarau he moved to German side SSV Ulm 1846, newly promoted to the second division. Ulm's strong 1998–99 season with Zdrilic a regular starter and scoring 12 goals for the season saw them promoted again into the Bundesliga, the club's first appearance in the top flight.

Now playing in a top European league, he earned a recall to national side in early 2000 for a tournament in Chile. Zdrilic was injured as a result of a bad tackle in the final minutes of Australia's game against Bulgaria and he returned to Ulm injured. He again rejoined the side in June as Australia hosted a three match series against Paraguay, which he scored his first international goal in a 2–1 win. Zdrilic remained with the side for the 2000 OFC Nations Cup, adding to his goal tally twice against Cook Islands.

Returning to club duties, with Zdrilic out injured for much of the season due to the knee injury he sustained on international duty, Ulm had been relegated back to the second division and Zdrilic sought to remain in the top league. Despite the injury Zdrilic scored 6 goals in 13 Bundesliga starts for Ulm and moved to SpVgg Unterhaching. The club struggled for consistency through the 2000–01 season and was eventually relegated, Zdrilic remaining with the club on its return to 2. Bundesliga. Haching continued to struggle for results in the 2001–02 season, relegated again at the end of the year. In contrast to club fortunes, Zdrilic was achieving greater success at international level throughout this time. Becoming a regular inclusion in an Australian side under Frank Farina, he was recalled for a friendly against Scotland to replace the injured Mark Viduka scoring in a memorable 2–0 victory at Hamden Park. He retained his place in the squad for the Oceania World Cup qualifiers. In Australia's second match of the tournament, he scored eight goals in a world record 31–0 win over American Samoa. He and his strike partner Archie Thompson, who scored 13 goals, broke the record for most goals scored in a senior international match. He remained in the team for the 2001 FIFA Confederations Cup, taking part in the Socceroos memorable victories over Mexico and Brazil.

With Unterhaching in financial trouble, Zdrilic gained a release and signed on to English First Division side Walsall, where he was soon joined by fellow Australian Steve Corica. In a season restricted by a calf injury, he made 29 appearances in the league and cup scoring five goals including the only goal against Wimbledon F.C. in the FA Cup fourth round. In May 2003 he parted from the club and after interest from other English sides and Norwegian side S.K. Brann, he signed to Scottish Premier League club Aberdeen on a one-year deal, making an immediate impact with a goal 80 seconds into his debut in a pre-season friendly against Liverpool and then again against Rangers in the league. Zdrilic went on to score 8 goals in all competitions including the winner in a memorable win over Celtic which ended Celtics unbeaten home run of 78 games. After being linked with Belgian clubs Lierse and Gent, and also 1860 Munich, he returned to 2nd Bundesliga at Eintracht Trier.

While facing difficulties at Aberdeen, his elevation back to the top flight of a European league returned him to national team contention. He was selected for a number of friendly matches and rejoined the squad in May for the 2004 OFC Nations Cup, which also doubled as qualifiers for the 2006 FIFA World Cup. After a goal against Tahiti, he made two more appearances against Fiji and Vanuatu.

Return to Australia

His stay at Trier was short-lived, and returned to Australia with the launch of the A-League in 2005 to be part of the inaugural Sydney FC squad, signing a three-year deal. Now back in Australia, he was included in a Socceroos side for a match on 29 March 2005 against Indonesia to benefit victims of the Boxing Day tsunami, scoring Australia's third goal in what many have tipped as his last international match. He took part in 19 of Sydney's matches in their first season, mostly as a substitute, scoring once. In the second season he found more game time under Terry Butcher, scoring four goals from 20 appearances.

Zdrilic remained at Sydney for the A-League 2007–08 season, in the final year of his original three-year contract. A number of matches saw him being deployed in the backline and midfield. Many Sydney FC fans became critical of his performances, after netting just five goals in his first two years at the club. Despite his clear intentions to add to his tally in the 2007–08 season, Zdrilic failed to score in any competitive matches all year and was released by Sydney at the end of the season. The end of his stay with Sydney FC effectively marked the end of his career.

In 2009, Zdrilic was approached by former teammate Ante Milicic to sign with his first professional club Sydney United, who play in the NSW Premier League. The team finished on the top of the table in the regular season but bowed out in semi-final. Zdrilic finished the season with eight goals and announced his decision to retire after 15 years as a professional footballer.

Post-playing career

Coaching
While playing at Sydney United, Zdrilic took up his first coaching role coaching with former NSL champions, Hakoah Sydney City East FC. In his maiden season as manager, Zdrilic guided the side to a semi-final berth but declined the club's offer to extend his contract for a second season.

The departure of Ante Milicic to A-League expansion club Melbourne Heart opened the opportunity for Zdrilic to become the player/manager at Sydney United. He spent one season in charge of the club before announcing his retirement as a player.

Despite enjoying more success as manager – taking United deep into the finals series in his first season at Edensor Park – Zdrilic left the club to concentrate on his growing media career. He was succeeded at the club by Jean-Paul de Marigny, returning for his second stint in charge.

Whilst away from the dugout, Zdrilic undertook a succession of coaching study tours in Europe, spending time at clubs such Bayern Munich, TSG 1899 Hoffenheim, Hajduk Split and Dinamo Zagreb.

In 2015, Zdrilic returned to the coaching ranks after being approached by Sydney FC to become the assistant coach of both the NSW NPL2 first team, NYL team and the under-20 side. Both sides won their respective leagues in August 2016, meaning the club will participate in the New South Wales NPL1 in 2017 for the first time. The following season saw Zdrilic take over the NPL1 U20 side as head coach whilst still remaining assistant coach to Robbie Stanton's NPL1 first team.

In July 2017, he accepted an offer from reigning Bundesliga runners-up RB Leipzig to become the assistant coach of the club's under-17 team, currently led by former VfB Stuttgart and TSG 1899 Hoffenheim striker Alexander Blessin. After a successful year with the U17's, the pair moved up to the U19's which is the club's reserve team feeding directly into the club's 1st team Bundesliga side.

"I spent a month at RB Leipzig last year on a study tour watching how they did things as well as learning from Ralf Rangnick and the other coaches," Zdrilic said. "I highlighted that I would like the opportunity to one day move over to Europe to coach. They were aware of my role with Sydney FC and my previous coaching and playing experience which played a big part in Leipzig offering me the position."

In January 2020, Zdrilic accepted an offer from Chicago Fire FC to become the assistant coach, where was credited with reforming the team’s approach into a more pressing-oriented style.

Zdrilic was linked with a move to then-English Premier League club Sheffield United but ultimately stayed with Chicago.

In mid-2021, Zdrilic returned to Europe after accepting an offer to reunite with Alexander Blessin - who he coached under at RB Leipzig - to become the assistant coach at Belgian side K.V. Oostende.

After impressing with their high-tempo style in Belgium, Blessin and Zdrilic were then poached by Italian Serie A club Genoa in January 2022, replacing the outgoing Andriy Shevchenko. The move made Zdrilic the first Australian to hold a coaching position at a Serie A side.

Media

After being released from Sydney FC, Zdrilic started working as a football pundit for both Fox Sports and ESPN, as well as featuring on SBS and writing a column for mX. He also took on a role as Player Relations Officer for Professional Footballers Australia.

Zdrilic continued to work in the media and co-hosted the now-discontinued World Football News on One, and was a core part of the 2010 FIFA World Cup coverage on SBS, appearing regularly as an analyst. He then joined SBS exclusively, which sees him continuing his analytical role, as well as co-hosting the football entertainment show Thursday FC.

Zdrilic soon moved into the hosting role full-time and began presenting the UEFA Champions League, Europa League and International Cup Competitions. He then hosted the 2014 FIFA World Cup in Brazil which won a Logie for Most Outstanding Sports Coverage. He was also the host of SBS's 4-year coverage of the A-League between 2014 and 2017.

In 2018, Zdrilic was again a key figure in SBS's coverage of the 2018 FIFA World Cup in Russia where he presented live from matches around the country as well as expert analysis alongside Craig Foster and Lucy Zelic from SBS's Moscow studio.

Beach Soccer
Since retiring, Zdrilic is a keen advocate for Beach Soccer and is a member of the Beach Socceroos. He has also captained the side. The Beach Socceroos travelled to Qatar in January 2013 for the Beach Soccer World Cup Qualifiers. Despite having no lead up practice matches and never before played together as a team, the Beach Socceroos narrowly missed out on a World Cup place finishing 4th out of 16 teams, only three World Cup spots were on offer. Zdrilic finished the tournament with 4 goals in 4 games.
Zdrilic is an Ambassador for one of the country's biggest International Tournaments, the Australia Beach Soccer Cup, played annually in Wollongong. In the last tournament, Zdrilic scored 8 goals in 3 games including 6 goals in a 7–5 win over China. Australia won the tournament.

Career statistics

Club

International goals
Scores and results list Australia's goal tally first, score column indicates score after each Zdrilic goal.

Honours
Australia
 OFC Nations Cup: 2004, 2000

Sydney FC
 A-League Championship: 2005–06
 Oceania Club Championship: 2004–05

Individual
 NSL top scorer: 1996–97 with Sydney United with 21 goals
 Logie Award nomination for Outstanding Sports Commentator: 2009

References

External links
 Oz Football profile
 NSW Premier League matches review

1974 births
Living people
Aberdeen F.C. players
A-League Men players
Australia international soccer players
Australian expatriate soccer players
Australian people of Croatian descent
SV Eintracht Trier 05 players
FC Aarau players
Bundesliga players
2. Bundesliga players
Association football forwards
National Soccer League (Australia) players
Soccer players from Sydney
Scottish Premier League players
SpVgg Unterhaching players
SSV Ulm 1846 players
Sydney FC players
Sydney United 58 FC players
Walsall F.C. players
Australian soccer players
Chicago Fire FC non-playing staff
Sydney United 58 FC managers
2000 OFC Nations Cup players
2001 FIFA Confederations Cup players
2004 OFC Nations Cup players
2005 FIFA Confederations Cup players
Expatriate footballers in England
Expatriate footballers in Germany
Expatriate footballers in Scotland
Expatriate footballers in Switzerland
Australian expatriate sportspeople in England
Australian expatriate sportspeople in Germany
Australian expatriate sportspeople in Scotland
Australian expatriate sportspeople in Switzerland